Manju Bhashini is an Indian television actress who features mainly in Kannada serials. She rose to fame as Samaja Sevaki Lalitamba in the sitcom Silli Lalli, which aired on ETV Kannada.

She also played the main role in the Kannada movie Bhoomi Geetha.
She is currently involved in the Lime Light Acting Academy, together with her costars from Silli Lalli.

Filmography

Film

Television

References

External links

Actresses from Bangalore
Actresses in Kannada cinema
Indian film actresses
Indian television actresses
Living people
Year of birth missing (living people)
Actresses in Kannada television
20th-century Indian actresses
21st-century Indian actresses